Back-Room Boy is a 1942 British comedy film directed by Herbert Mason, produced by Edward Black for Gainsborough Pictures and distributed by General Film Distributors. The cast includes Arthur Askey, Googie Withers, Graham Moffatt and Moore Marriott. The original story was written by J.O.C. Orton, Marriott Edgar and Val Guest. A man from the Met Office is sent to a lighthouse on a remote Scottish island to monitor the weather, where he hopes to escape from women, but soon finds the island overrun by them.

Back-Room Boy was released to cinemas in the United Kingdom on 17 April, 1942.

Plot
Meteorologist Arthur Pilbeam's fiancée Betty breaks their engagement because he does not spend enough time with her due to having to attend at the BBC every hour, on the hour, for his internationally vital job of creating the BBC pips. He is so upset, he uses the pips to play "Shave and a Haircut". When he is reprimanded, he tries to resign, but he is not allowed do that during wartime, so, when he says he wants to avoid all women, he is posted to a remote Scottish lighthouse to make weather reports. Before taking a boat from the mainland, his is warned by the locals that he will go mad from the isolation and the curse of a mermaid within a month, as his predecessors have. He still goes to the island, but as soon as he lands he is disturbed as most of his baggage disappears.

But then Pilbeam encounters Jane, a young girl who stowed away on the boat that brought him to the island, and then Bobbie, a model and the sole survivor of a torpedoed ship. His radio disappears, and Bobbie sees a man tied up in a cupboard, but he disappears when she shows Pilbeam. Then she is attacked, but her assailant is also nowhere to be seen when Pilbeam returns. Finally, another boatload of women plus some crewmen arrive from Bobbie's ship. This makes it very crowded in the lighthouse, until people start to mysteriously disappear during the night, leaving an anxious Pilbeam trying to discover what has happened to everyone, until finally, only Pilbeam is left.

It turns out that Nazi agents have been secretly sweeping the nearby waters of mines and have taken everyone else prisoner, leaving Pilbeam free just so he can send away a rescue party without arousing suspicion. But between Pilbeam, Jane's uncle (from the neighbouring island) and the women, they manage to turn the tables on their captors. They tie the Germans up and set out on the German boat. On the way back to the mainland, however, they come across an enemy warship in the fog. The Germans mistake them for their own spies and order them to guide them through the minefield. Their small boat is able to avoid the mines but the ship strikes a mine and sinks.

Pilbeam returns to London a hero, to find Betty has been given his old job on the pips. Having apparently rebuffed him, she plays "Shave and a Haircut" and he rushes off to see her.

Cast
 Arthur Askey - Arthur Pilbeam
 Moore Marriott - Jerry
 Graham Moffatt - Albert
 Googie Withers - Bobbie
 Vera Frances - Jane
 Joyce Howard - Betty
 John Salew - Steve Mason
 George Merritt - Uncle
 Aubrey Mallalieu (uncredited) - West 
 D. J. Williams (uncredited)- McIntyre

Production
Arthur Askey replaced Will Hay when Hay moved from Gainsborough to Ealing Studios before the Second World War. Filming took place at Gaunt-British Studios, Lime Grove Studios and Shepherd's Bush, London, England.

Reception
In his book about 1940s British cinema, Realism and Tinsel, Robert Murphy describes the film as "the funniest if the least original of the Askey comedies". Halliwell's Film Video & DVD Guide describes the film as a "[fairly] spirited star comedy of interest as a shameless rip-off of The Ghost Train and Oh Mr Porter!." In Beacons in the Dark, film historian Robyn Ludwig critiques the film as "symptomatic of homophobic and chauvinistic undercurrents in Great Britain during the war". David Parkinson in Radio Times said, "The main problem is the film's insistence on hammering home every gag, with Askey particularly at fault." However, he praised the subsidiary action between Moffatt and Marriott and Googie Withers' performance.

Home media
Back-Room Boy was released on DVD on 19 February 2007. The film was also released in the Arthur Askey Collection box set on DVD in 2007 in the United Kingdom, followed by another edition in 2012.

References

Bibliography
 Mayer, Geoff. (2003). Guide to British Cinema. Greenwood Publishing Group
 Murphy, Robert. (1989). Realism and Tinsel: Cinema and Society in Britain, 1939-1949. Routledge
 Walker, John. (ed). (2004). Halliwell's Film Video & DVD Guide 2004. HarperCollins Entertainment. 19th edition

External links
 
 

 Back-Room Boy at Park Circus
 Back-Room Boy at AllMovie
 Back-Room Boy at Rotten Tomatoes

1942 films
1940s spy comedy films
1940s English-language films
British black-and-white films
British spy comedy films
Films directed by Herbert Mason
Films set in Scotland
Gainsborough Pictures films
Films shot at Lime Grove Studios
Films with screenplays by Marriott Edgar
World War II films made in wartime
1942 comedy films
1940s British films